The College of Saint Mary is a private Catholic women's university in Omaha, Nebraska. Enrollment totaled 1,018 students in fall of 2014: 735 undergraduates, 243 graduate, and 40 non-degree seeking students. It offers more than 30 undergraduate and seven graduate degree programs.

Athletics
The Saint Mary (CSM) athletic teams are called the Flames. The college is a member of the National Association of Intercollegiate Athletics (NAIA), primarily competing in the Great Plains Athletic Conference (GPAC) for most of its sports since the 2015–16 academic year; while its swimming & diving team competes in the Kansas Collegiate Athletic Conference (KCAC). The Flames previously competed in the defunct Midlands Collegiate Athletic Conference (MCAC) from 1994–95 to 2014–15 (when the conference dissolved).

CSM competes in 11 intercollegiate varsity sports: basketball, bowling, competitive dance, cross country, golf, soccer, softball, swimming, tennis, track & field and volleyball.

Notable alumnae
 Sharon "Alex" Kava '82, novelist

References

External links
 
 Official athletics website

Women's universities and colleges in the United States
Educational institutions established in 1923
Buildings and structures in Omaha, Nebraska
Education in Omaha, Nebraska
Former Midlands Collegiate Athletic Conference schools
Catholic universities and colleges in Nebraska
Roman Catholic Archdiocese of Omaha
Sisters of Mercy colleges and universities
Great Plains Athletic Conference schools
1923 establishments in Nebraska
Women in Nebraska